{{safesubst:#invoke:RfD|||month = March
|day = 19
|year = 2023
|time = 23:41
|timestamp = 20230319234116

|content=
REDIRECT D. J. Moore 

}}